Rumali roti also called Manda. It is eaten with tandoori dishes. The word rumal means handkerchief in many north Indian languages, and the name rumali roti means handkerchief bread. In Punjab, it is also known as lamboo roti. Lamboo simply means long in Punjabi. It is also known as dosti roti in the Caribbean.

This bread is extremely thin and limp, and served folded like a handkerchief.

Rumali is usually made with a combination of whole wheat atta flour and white wheaten maida flour and cooked on the convex side of a karahi.

A variation of rumali roti from Bannu and surrounding areas of Waziristan is a much larger version called paasti or paosti chappatai, which means soft chappati. They are served as part of a meal known as penda, usually prepared for a large gathering. Paosti is baked on a batt, which is a 55-gallon drum split in half length-wise and inverted over coal or wood fire.

History 
In the late Buddhist period, Mandaka, today called mande or manda or puran poli was a large paratha bread stuffed with sweetened pulse paste and baked on an inverted pot. Rumali roti is its plain version.

References

Indian breads
Indian cuisine
Hyderabadi cuisine
Bihari cuisine
North Indian cuisine
Telangana cuisine
South Indian cuisine
Mughlai cuisine
Indo-Caribbean cuisine
Pakistani breads
Flatbreads
Roti